Musalli Al-Muammar is the current President of Al Nassr FC. He is a former head of the Saudi Pro League.

He holds a bachelor's degree in finance from King Fahd University of Petroleum and Minerals, a master's degree in marketing communications from Manchester Metropolitan University, and a global executive master's in international sports law from the Higher Institute of Law and Economics in Spain.

References

Year of birth missing (living people)
Living people
King Fahd University of Petroleum and Minerals alumni
Alumni of Manchester Metropolitan University